Alexander Ivashkin, (17 August 1948 – 31 January 2014) was a Russian cellist, writer, academic and conductor.

Ivashkin studied at the Gnessin Institute, where his teachers included Gennady Rozhdestvensky and Valery Polyansky.  He also played electric cello, viola da gamba, sitar and piano.  Ivashkin became co-principal cellist of the Bolshoi Theatre Orchestra.  In 1978, he founded the Bolshoi Soloists, a new chamber orchestra.

From 1995, Ivashkin founded the Adam International Cello Festival and Competition. He was also artistic director of annual festivals in London, including The VTB Capital Prize for Young Cellists. In 1999 he founded a series of research and performance seminars/symposia and international concert series at the Centre for Russian Music. He was the curator of Alfred Schnittke Archive at Goldsmiths and the editor-in-chief of the ongoing Schnittke Collected Works Critical edition in 63 volumes.  Ivashkin published twenty books, on Schnittke, Ives, Penderecki, Rostropovich and others, and more than 200 articles in Russia, Germany, Italy, the US, the UK and Japan.

Ivashkin was the first performer and dedicatee of many contemporary compositions for cello, by such composers as Alfred Schnittke. He actively collaborated with composers such as John Cage, George Crumb, Mauricio Kagel, Krzysztof Penderecki, Peter Sculthorpe, Brett Dean, Edison Denisov, Sofia Gubaidulina, Giya Kancheli, Arvo Pärt, Rodion Shchedrin, Nikolai Korndorf, Dmitri Smirnov, Elena Firsova, Alexander Raskatov, Vladimir Tarnopolsky, Augusta Read Thomas, James MacMillan, Lyell Cresswell, Roger Redgate, Gabriel Prokofiev and Gillian Whitehead.

Ivashkin made commercial recordings for such labels as Chandos,  BMG and Naxos.  These issues include the complete cello music by Rakhmaninov, Prokofiev, Shostakovich, Roslavets, Tcherepnine, Gubaidulina, Schnittke and Kancheli to his credit.

In 1969, Ivashkin married fellow musician Natalia Pavlutskaya, who survives her husband.

Discography
 "Russian Elegy". Original pieces for cello and piano written by Russian composers  from the 18th to the 20th century.  With Ingripd Wahlberg, piano. Ode Records  MANU 1426,  1993.
 "Music for cello solo".  World premiere recordings.  Melodyia   SUCD 10-005566, 1994.
 "Alfred Schnittke. Four Hymns for cello and ensemble".  With the Bolshoi Soloists.  [The Third Hymn is dedicated to A.Ivashkin.] Melodiya SUCD 00061 – Russia; Mobile Fidelity MFCD 915 – US). World premiere recording. New releases: VoxBox, US, 1994,1996.  Diapason D’Or Award ( France)
 "Alfred Schnittke, Music for Cello and Piano". World premiere recordings. With Tamas Vesmas. Ode Records   MANU 1480, 1995.
 "Sergei Prokofiev. Complete Music for Cello and Piano". With Tamas Vesmas. Ode Records  MANU 1414, 1996.
 "Bohiuslav Martinu. Chamber Music". Naxos, 8.553916, 1996.
 "Alexander Gretchaninov. Cello Concerto, op. 8".  World premiere recording. Chandos  CHAN 9559, 1997.
 "Dmitri Shostakovich. Cello Concertos Nos.1–2". BMG/Ode Records MANU 1542, 1997.
 "Alfred Schnittke. Complete Music for Cello and Piano". With Irina Schnittke, piano. World premiere recording. Chandos,  CHAN 9705, 1998. CD of the month', BBC Music Magazine, 1998. "Alfred Schnittke. Cello Concerto No.2". With  Russian State SO, Chandos CHAN 9722,1999
 "Alexander Tcherepnin. Complete Music	for Cello and Piano". With  Geoofrey Tozer, piano. Chandos, CHAN 9770, 1999.
 "Unknown Shostakovich: Schumann – Shostakovich. Cello Concerto,  op.129/126; Tishchenko-Shostakovich. Cello Concerto No.1". World premiere recording. With  Russian State SO. Chandos, CHAN 9792 .
 "Franz Schubert. String Quintet in C major D956, Dmitri Shostakovich. Piano Trio No 2". With Isabelle van Keulen, violin,  Mark Lubotsky, violin, The Goldner Quartet, Boris Berman, piano. ABC Classics 465 841 -2, 2000.
 "Under the Southern Cross. New music for solo cello from Australia and New Zealand". BMG,1999. Recording Industry Award, 1999.'
 "Alfred Schnittke – Concerto No. 1". With Russian State Symphony Orchestra under Valery Poliansky..  Chandos CHAN  9852, 2000.  Best CD in last 5 years – 'Fanfare', US. 
 "Alfred Schnittke – Chamber Music". With  Mark Lubotsky, violin, Irina Schnittke, piano, Theodore Kuchar, viola. Naxos 8-554728, 2000. Best CD of the year, BBC Music Magazine.
 "Unknown Prokofiev -Concerto for cello &orchestra op.58, Concertino op 132, orchestrated by Vladimir Blok, Cadenza by Alfred Schnittke". With Russian State Symphony Orchestra under Valery Poliansky. Chandos,CHAN 9890, 2001.World premiere recording. The Strad Selection, July 2001.
 "Nikolai Roslavets . Complete Music for cello and piano". With Tatyana Lazareva, piano. Chandos, CHAN 9881, 2001. CD of the month, BBC Music Magazine, April 2001.
 "Sofia Gubaidulina. Works for Cello".  With Natalia Pavlutskaya, cello, Rachel Johnston, cello, Miranda Wilson, cello, Malcolm Hicks, organ. Chandos, CHAN 9958, 2001. World premiere recording.
 "Nikolai Korndorf. Passacaglia for cello solo" (dedicated to Alexander Ivashkin), String Trio, Piano Trio. With Patricia Kopachinskaya, violin, Daniel Raiskin,viola, Ivan Sokolov, piano. Megadisc 7817, 2001.  World premiere recording.
 "Dmitry Smirnov. (Introduction to Dmitri Smirnov) Piano Trio, Sonata for cello and piano, Elegy for cello solo (in memory of Edison Denisov)". With Patricia Kopachinskaya, violin, Ivan Sokolov, piano (and Alissa Firsova, piano). Megadisc 7818, 2001. World premiere recording.
 "Sergei Prokofiev . Sinfonia-Concertante, op. 125".  With Russian State Symphony Orchestra under Valery Poliansky.. Chandos, CHAN 9989, 2002 .
 "Nikolai Myaskovsky. Cello Concerto". With Russian State Symphony Orchestra under Valery Poliansky. Chandos, CHAN 10025, 2002 .
 "Sergei Prokofiev. Complete Cello/piano Music". With Tatyana Lazareva, piano. Chandos, CHAN 10045, 2003.
 "Sergei Rakhmaninoiv. Complete Cello/piano Music". With Rustem Hayroudinoff, piano. Chandos CHAN 10095, 2004.
 "Alfred Schnittke. Concerto Grosso No 2". With Tatyana Grindenko, violin, Russian State Symphony Orchestra under Valery Poliansky. Chandos, CHAN 10180, 2004.
 "Giya Kancheli. Simi; Mourned by the wind for cello and orchestra". With Russian State Symphony Orchestra under Valery PolianskyChandos CHAN 10297, 2005.
 "Dmitri Shostakovich. Cello Concertos, Nos 1 and 2".  With Russian State Symphony Orchestra under Valery Poliansky. Brilliant Classics 7620, 2006
 "Alfred Schnittke. Concerto for Three, Dialogue". 'Chandos' (in preparation).
 "Alexander Ivashkin plays Schnittke" (Double CD). Complete Cello Concertos and Sonatas.  Chandos, CHAN 241–39, 2007.  Best Re-issue of the month – Gramophone
 "Due Celli (Music by Pergolesi, Vivaldi, Boccherini, Boismortier, Mozart, and Schnittke)". With Natalia Pavlutskaya, cello.  Alma Classics 5031, 2007.
 "Hommage a Anna Akhmatova." (includes Beethoven Sonata op 102, No 1; Bach – Solo cello BWV 1010; Britten – Solo Cello Suite No. 3; Kancheli  – ' Nach dem Weinen' for solo cello',  World premiere recording; Shostakovich – Cello Concerto No 2). Alma Classics 5022, 2008.
 "Alexander Ivashkin plays Prokofiev" (Double CD). Complete Cello Concertos and Sonatas.  Chandos, CHAN 241–41, 2008.
 "Pacific Voyage". With Ora Barlow and Kim Halliday. Alma Classics 5028, 2009.
 "Edison Denisov. The Blue Notebook". World premiere recording.   With Elena Komarova, soprano, Vladimir Smekhov, reciter, Tigran Alikhanov, piano. Moscow: Moscow State Tchaikovsky Conservatoire  SMC CD 0106, 2009.
 "Alfred Schnittke: Discoveries. Yellow Sound, Dialogue for cello and instrumental ensemble, Variations for String Quartet".  World premiere recording. Alexander Ivashkin, cello/voice. London: Toccata Classics TOCC 0091, 2010.
 "Russian Cello Concertos 1960–2000. With various orchestras." Concertos by Denisov, Schnittke, Vustin, Shchedrin, including first recordings. Alma Classics, MANU 5029, 2010. 
 "Nikolay Korndorf. Complete Music for Cello." With Russian Philharmonic Orchestra, conducted by Konstantin Krimets.  Anya Alexeev, piano. First recordings. London: Toccata Classics, TOCC 0128,  2012.
 Ivashkin plays Gubaidulina, Tarnopolski and Redgate. Alma Classics 5032, 2013
 Britten .Complete Music for Cello Solo and Cello and Piano. With Andrew Zolinsky (piano). Including world premiere recording of Britten's Sonata for cello and piano in A. Brilliant Classics 94729, 2013.

Publications
Selected books
Contemplating Shostakovich: Life, Music and Film . Edited by Alexander Ivashkin and Andrew Kirkman. Farnham: Ashgate, 2012 
Schnittke Studies. Edited by Gavin Dixon and  Alexander Ivashkin. Bloomington-Indianapolis: Indiana University Press (in progress).
Rostropovich. Tokyo: Shunjusha Publishing Company, 2007. 280 pp.
Alfred Schnittke: Stat'I o muzyke [Articles on music]. Edited by Alexander Ivashkin. Moscow: Kompozitor, 2003. 407 pp.
A Schnittke Reader. Bloomington /Indianapolis: Indiana University Press, 2002. 352pp.
Rostrospective (On the Life and Achievement of Mstislav Rostropovich). Frankfurt-Schweinfurth: Reimund Maier Verlag, 1997. 142 pp.
Alfred Schnittke. London: Phaidon Press, 1996, 240 pp.
Besedy s Alfredom Schnittke [Conversations with Alfred Schnittke ]. Moscow: The Culture Publishersg, 1994. 304 pp. Second, revised edition: Moscow: Klassica-XXI, 2003, 316 pp. German Edition: Munich: 1999. Japanese Edition: Tokyo, 2002.
Charl'z Aivz i muzyka XX vieka [Charles Ives and the 20th-century music]. Moscow: Sovetsky Kompozitor, 1991. 464 pp.
Krzysztof Penderecki. Moscow: Sovetsky  Kompozitor, 1983. 126 pp.

Selected articles
'John Cage in Soviet Russia'.  Tempo, 67/266, October 2013, 18–27.
'Shostakovich, Old Believers and New Minimalists’. Contemplating Shostakovich: Life, Music and Film. Edited by Alexander Ivashkin and Andrew Kirkman. Farnham: Ashgate, 2012, 17–40.
'Kod Schnittke' ['The Schnittke Code']. Al'fredu Schnittke posviashchaetsia [Dedicated to Alfred Schnittke: Schnittke Yearbook, 8]. Moscow: Kompozitor, 2011: 13–24.
"Symbols, Metaphors and Irrationalities in Twentieth-Century Music." Cataño, Rafael Jiménez and Yarza, Ignacio (ed.). Mimesi, Verità e Fiction. Roma: Edusc, 2009, 69–87.
"Cooling the Volcano: Prokofiev’s Cello Concerto Op. 58 and ‘Symphony-Concerto’ Op. 125". Three Oranges, Journal of the Serge Prokofiev Foundation, No. 18 (November 2009): 7–14.
"Podsolnukh [Sunflower]. Rostropovich in memoriam". Muzykal'naya Academia. Moscow, 2007/3: 1 – 16. Short English version: Radius Solis. Three Oranges, Journal of the Serge Prokofiev Foundation, No. 14 (November 2007): 25–27.
"Dvoinaya pererabotka otkhodov v sovetskoi muzyke [Double recycling in Soviet music]". Iskusstvo XX veka: elite i massy [ The 20th-century Art: Elite and Masses]. Nizhny Novgorod: The Glinka Conservatoire Press, 2005, 12-18.
"Logic of Absurdity or Taste of Freedom? Alexander Knaifel and his opera 'Alice in Wonderland'". Tempo, 219 (2002): 34–36
"Alfred Schnittke." New Grove Dictionary. London: Macmillan. 2001 (with Ivan Moody)
‘…und wenn es mir den Hals bricht’.  "Zum Gedenken an Alfred Schnittke". MusikTexte. Heft 78, March 1999, 27- 31.
"Shostakovich and Schnittke: the erosion of symphonic syntax". D.Fanning (ed.) Shostakovich Studies. Cambridge: Cambridge University Press, 1995, 252–268.
"The Paradox of Russian Non-Liberty". The Musical Quarterly, vol. 76, no. 4 (1992): 543–556
"Die Musik als grosse Buhne". Kagel . . . 1991. Köln: DuMont Buchverlag, 1991, 110–119
"Charles Ives: Otkrytie Ameriki". Zapadnoye Iskusstvo. XX vek. [Charles Ives: Discovery of the America. In Western Art. 20th Century]. Moscow: Nauka, 1991,  222–247
"Sowietische Musik.  Von der Struktur zum Symbol". Sowietische Musik im Licht der Perestroika.  Berlin: Laaber, 1990, 109–117
"Post-October Soviet Art: Canon and Symbol". The Musical Quarterly, vol. 74, no. 2 (1990): 350–368

Music scores edited
Sergei Rakhmaninov. Melody on a Theme for cello and piano. First publication. Edited and prefaced by Alexander Ivashkin. Hamburg: Hans Sikorski Musikverlage (in preparation).
Alfred Schnittke. Collected Works. Critical Edition in sixty-seven volumes.  Compiled and prefaced by Alexander Ivashkin. St.Petersburg: Compozitor,  2007 –  .  Alexander Ivashkin, editor-in-chief (in progress).
Alexander Grechaninov. Cello Concerto ( 1895). Performance edition from the manuscript.  Moscow: State Symphony Capella, 1998.
Frangiz Ali-Zade. Habil-Sayahy for cello and piano. Edited and prefaced by Alexander Ivashkin.  Hamburg, Hans Sikorski Internationale Musikverlage, 1991.
Twentieth-century American piano music. Compiled, prefaced and commented on by Alexander Ivashkin and Andrei Khitruk. Moscow: Muzyka State Publishers, 1991.
Charles Ives. Works for Orchestra. Critical Edition. Compiled, prefaced and commented on by Alexander Ivashkin. Kiev: Muzychna Ukraina, 1990.

References

External links
 Official website
 Wikilivres.ru
 Centre for Russian Music in Goldsmiths College
 Alfred Schnittke Archive
 : Alexander Ivashkin's tomb at the Novodevichy Cemetery, Moscow  

1948 births
2014 deaths
People from Blagoveshchensk
Russian cellists
Russian expatriates in the United Kingdom